Six ships of the British Royal Navy, and four tenders of the RNVR, have been named HMS Isis, after the Egyptian goddess Isis.

 The second  was the French ship  captured in 1747 and converted to a 50-gun fourth-rate, continuing in use until 1766.
 The third  was a 50-gun fourth rate launched in 1774, and broken up in 1810.
 The fourth  was a 50-gun fourth rate launched in 1819, hulked in 1861 and sold 1867.
 The fifth  was an  protected cruiser in use from 1896 to 1920.
 The sixth  was an  launched in 1936.
 HMS Isis (M2010) was a  launched in 1955 as HMS Cradley, renamed HMS Isis in 1963 and sold 1982.

Royal Navy ship names